Duncan Lake is a man-made reservoir lake in the Kootenay region of British Columbia, Canada, formed by Duncan Dam and about 45 km in length.  It is fed by the Duncan River, which forms part of the boundary between the Selkirk Mountains to the west and the Purcell Mountains to the east.  Below Duncan Dam is the head of Kootenay Lake.

Prior to inundation there was a lake of shorter length at the same location, also named Duncan Lake but also known as Upper Kootenay Lake or Upper Kootenai Lake.  The name comes from the Duncan River's namesake, John "Jack" Duncan, prospector, who ran for election but did not win the Kootenay District seat on the colonial Legislative Council of British Columbia.

See also
Columbia River Treaty
Duncan Lake known as Amazay Lake located in the Omineca Mountains of the Northern Interior of British Columbia, Canada.

References

Lakes of British Columbia
Reservoirs in British Columbia
West Kootenay
Kootenay Land District